PJA may refer to

PJA-TV
Plain Jane Automobile
Progressive Jewish Alliance